VooDoo & Serano are a duo of DJs and producers/remixers from Germany. They are made up of DJ VooDoo (aka Reinhard Raith) and Tommy Serano.

Discography

Albums
Cold Blood (2002)
Back for More (2004)

Charted singles

Other singles
"Kick da Groove" (1997)
"Welcome to the Space" (1998)
"This Is Acid" (2001)
"Cold Blood" (2002)
"This Is Entertainment" (2004)
"Don't You Know" (2005)
"Blood Is Pumpin'" (2005)
"Vulnerable" (2006)
"Dirty" (2006)
"Transatlantic Blow" (2008)
"Feel Me" (2010)

Remixes
1998 - DJ Digress - In My Mind
1998 - Tommy Serano Feat. DJ Voodoo - Welcome To The Space
2001 - Ayumi Hamasaki - Fly High
2001 - N-Trance - Forever
2001 - N-Trance - Set You Free
2001 - Kyau vs. Albert - Outside
2001 - JT Company - Wake Me Tonight
2002 - Mr. Phillips - 7th Day (I Will Be There)
2002 - Ian Van Dahl - Will I?
2002 - Gardeweg - All I Want
2002 - Warp Brothers - Cokane
2002 - Every Little Thing - Forever Yours
2002 - Marc Maris vs. Ramone - Eternity
2002 - N-Trance - Forever
2002 - Hampenberg - Listen Up
2002 - DJ Dean - Play It Hard
2002 - Green Court Feat. Lina Rafn - Silent Heart
2002 - CJ Stone - Into The Sea
2002 - Divine Inspiration - The Way (Put Your Hand In My Hand)
2003 - QFX - Freedom
2003 - DJ Shog - Another World
2003 - Voodoo & Serano vs. Bass Bumpers - Music's Got Me
2003 - Yomanda - You're Free
2003 - Pascal - This Will Be (The Best Days Of Our Lives)
2003 - N-Trance - Destiny
2003 - Friday Night Posse - Kiss This
2003 - Ayumi Hamasaki - Endless Sorrow
2003 - CJ Stone - Don't Look Back
2003 - Flip & Fill - Field Of Dreams
2003 - RMB - Reality
2003 - Green Court - Silent Heart
2003 - DJ Yanny Pres. Terraformer - Won't Forget These Days
2004 - Ultrabeat - Better Than Life
2004 - Dance Assassins - Here I Am
2004 - N-Trance - I'm In Heaven
2005 - P.S. - Der Menschliche Faktor
2005 - Potatoheadz Featuring Lizzy Pattinson - Narcotic
2006 - Plastik Funk - Gonna Make You Sweat (Everybody Dance Now!)
2006 - VooDoo & Serano - Don't You Know
2007 - Nena, Olli + Remmler - Ich Kann Nix Dafür
2007 - Sublime - The Rain
2007 - Robyn with Kleerup - With Every Heartbeat
2008 - Robyn - Handle Me
2008 - Re-Fuge Ft. Nicole Tyler - So Real
2008 - Basshunter - All I Ever Wanted
2009 - Anna Grace - You Make Me Feel
2009 - Da Hool - Summer
2009 - Franky Miller - Jumping
2010 - Remady feat. Lumidee & Chase Manhattan - I'm No Superstar
2013 - Lumidee vs. Fatman Scoop - Dance!

DJ Mixes
2001 - Viva Ibiza
2002 - Techno Club Vol. 16
2003 - The Spirit of Space - Ibiza
2004 - This Is Trance! 2

References

Sources
VooDoo & Serano
Voodoo & Serano | Listen and Stream Free Music, Albums, New Releases, Photos, Videos
Voodoo & Serano

German electronic music groups